Juozas Lukša (10 August 1921 – 4 September 1951), also known among other pseudonyms as Daumantas and Skirmantas, was a leader of the anti-Soviet Lithuanian partisan armed resistance movement.

Life

Lukša was born on 10 August 1921 to a family of farmers in the village of Juodbūdis, near Kaunas. He attended , where he joined the catholic youth organization Ateitis and the far-right, anti-semitic and anti-Soviet Lithuanian Activist Front (LAF). He graduated high school in 1940 and began studying architecture at Vytautas Magnus University.

Due to being a member of the LAF, Lukša was imprisoned by the NKVD in Kaunas during the 1940–41 Soviet occupation of the Baltic states. He was released by the Wehrmacht following the invasion of Lithuania by Nazi Germany, and went on to continue his architecture studies.

After the return of the Red Army in 1944, Lukša engaged in the underground movement. At first he participated as a student, helping out with clandestine matters and unarmed resistance in Kaunas. In 1946, after the arrests of many activists, he left the city and joined the armed resistance. Within a year he commanded the Birutė brigade of the Tauras military district.

At the end of 1947, along with fellow partisans Jurgis Krikščiūnas-Rimvydas and Kazimieras Pyplys-Mažytis, Lukša crossed through the Iron Curtain with the goal of attracting support for the fighters and establishing contacts with Lithuanians in exile. They carried information collected by partisans about Soviet repressions, killings and deportations, and a letter asking for support from Pope Pius XII. He arrived in Sweden and moved from there to France and West Germany, where he was trained by French intelligence agents and the CIA. While in Paris, he met doctor , whom he married on 23 July 1950.

During his stay in the West, Lukša wrote Fighters for Freedom, a firsthand account of partisan activities in 1944–47. He was parachuted back into Lithuania by the CIA sometime between 1949 and 1950. That year, he was granted the honorary title of "Hero of the Lithuanian Freedom Fighters" (Laisvės kovos karžygio garbės vardas) and awarded with the Cross of the Freedom Struggle (1st class) by the Union of Lithuanian Freedom Fighters. In 1951 he was granted a rank of "Major of Partisans" (Partizanų majoro laipsnis). 

Lukša was intensively searched for by the Soviet counterintelligence, before being killed near Pabartupis by the MGB in the fall of 1951.

Legacy
In 1997 Juozas Lukša was posthumously awarded the Order of the Cross of Vytis (first class).

In 2003, director Jonas Vaitkus released a movie based on Lukša's life entitled Utterly Alone. In 2014, co-directors Jonas Ohman and Vincas Sruoginis released a documentary entitled The Invisible Front on Lukša and his fellow "Forest Brothers".

In June 2020, the Lithuanian parliament's Committee on Education and Science submitted a proposal to designate 2021 as the "Year of Juozas Lukša-Daumantas."

The Central European University Press published a fresh English translation of Lukša's book in 2009 under the title Forest Brothers: The Account of an Anti-Soviet Lithuanian Freedom Fighter, 1944-1948, ISBN 978-9639776371.

Alleged participation in the Kaunas pogrom

Controversy exists regarding Lukša's role during the Nazi occupation of Lithuania. According to multiple witnesses, Lukša was a participant in the 1941 Lietukis garage massacres in Kaunas, and allegedly took part in the murder and decapitation of Rabbi Zalman Osovsky. The Lithuanian government denies these claims.

See also
 Lithuanian partisans

Further reading

References

1921 births
1951 deaths
Guerrillas killed in action
Lithuanian Activist Front members
Lithuanian partisans
Lithuanian resistance members
People from Prienai District Municipality
Soviet dissidents